Pietari Holopainen (born 26 September 1982) is a Finnish retired professional football defender who currently plays for the Veikkausliiga side KuPS in Finland.

References
 Guardian Football
 Veikkausliiga Hall of Fame
 Veikkausliiga

1982 births
Living people
Finnish footballers
FC Haka players
Kuopion Palloseura players
Veikkausliiga players
Association football defenders